Derevnya razyezda Ryabash (Räbaş razyezı) is a rural locality (a village) in Malinovsky Selsoviet, Belebeyevsky District, Bashkortostan, Russia. The population was 47 in 2010. There is one street.

Geography 
The village is located 23 km southwest of Belebey (the district's administrative centre) by road. Yekaterinovka is the nearest rural locality.

References 

Rural localities in Belebeyevsky District